The Ghana Investment Promotion Centre (GIPC) is the Government of Ghana agency established to encourage, promote and facilitate investments in all sectors of the economy of Ghana except mining and petroleum which are handled by the Ghana Chamber of Mines and the Ghana National Petroleum Corporation.

See also
Investment promotion agency

References

Ministries and Agencies of State of Ghana